Brian Cox is an American special effects artist. He was nominated for an Academy Award in the category Best Visual Effects for the film Love and Monsters.

Selected filmography 
 Love and Monsters (2020; co-nominated with Matt Sloan, Genevieve Camilleri and Matt Everitt)

References

External links 

Living people
Place of birth missing (living people)
Year of birth missing (living people)
Special effects people
Special effects coordinators